The men's team sprint was one of the six men's events at the 2010 European Track Championships, held in Pruszków, Poland.

Eleven teams of two cyclists each participated in the contest. After the qualifying, the fastest two teams raced for gold, and the 3rd and 4th teams raced for bronze.

The qualifying and the finals were held on 5 November.

World record

Qualifying
The fastest two teams raced for gold and 3rd and 4th teams raced for bronze.

Finals

References

Qualifying results
Final results

Men's Team sprint
European Track Championships – Men's team sprint